Cork-based Nomos were an Irish traditional music band during the 1990s. The group formed in 1990 and consisted of Niall Vallely on concertina, Vince Milne on fiddle, Frank Torpey on bodhran, Gerry McKee on bouzouki, and Eoin Coughlan on vocals and bass. They have been described as one of the "most popular Irish bands of the 1990s," and as "one of the more innovative and fiery Irish traditional bands".

Origins of the band

Originally the group included Liz Doherty on fiddle and John Spillane on vocals and guitar. Doherty and Spillane formed Nomos with Vallely, Torpey, and McKee at University College Cork. The band followed a musical path begun by artists such as The Chieftains, Clannad, Planxty, Altan, Natalie McMaster, and Eileen Ivers.

The Sound

The group's fiery sound centered on Vallely's innovative and dynamic concertina playing and Milne's flashy fiddling. Milne's contributions displayed both his West Cork heritage and his affinity for bluegrass. Vallely, of Armagh, also composed and played the low whistle. The rhythm contributions of Coughlan have been compared to Planxty and the Bothy Band, and the bassist/vocalist also writes some of the group's songs. Torpey hails from Wexford, while McKee was born in Lisburn.

Discography

Albums
I Won't Be Afraid Anymore (1996)
Set You Free (1997)

References

Irish folk musical groups
Musical groups from Cork (city)